Shenmu may refer to:

Shenmue, or Shenmu, adventure game developed by Sega-AM2
Shenmu City, in Shaanxi, China